Mark Garside (born 21 March 1989 in East Kilbride) is a Scottish professional ice hockey player. He currently plays defence for the Belfast Giants of the EIHL.

References

External links
 

Scottish ice hockey defencemen
Belfast Giants players
Edinburgh Capitals players
Nottingham Panthers players
1989 births
Living people
Sportspeople from East Kilbride